In 1962 and 1963, industrial accidents spilled 3.5 million gallons of oil into the Mississippi and Minnesota Rivers. The oil covered the Mississippi River from St. Paul to Lake Pepin, creating an ecological disaster and a demand to control water pollution.

On December 7, 1962, workers at the Richards Oil Plant in Savage forgot to open steam lines that heated oil pipes at the plant. On December 8, these pipes burst in low temperatures. They spilled one million gallons of petroleum into the Minnesota River. By January 24, 1963, the Department of Health traced downstream oil back to Richards Oil. Employees claimed only a small leak had occurred. The Department of Health requested that Richards Oil clean up the oil but could only take action if there was a public health emergency. Richards continued to drain oil until March.

Second spill
On January 23, 1963, a storage tank collapsed at Honeymead Products Company. The accident violently spilled 3.5 million gallons of soybean oil into downtown Mankato. The company recovered some of the oil, but citizens drained 2.5 million gallons of it into nearby rivers.

In March, the ice on the Minnesota and Mississippi Rivers thawed, depositing oil between St. Paul and Lake Pepin. The Twin Cities dumped industrial waste into this area of the river and the oil was unnoticed. This changed on March 28, 1963. Residents noticed oil-covered ducks struggling in the Mississippi River. Ice on Lake Pepin had dammed floating oil, creating a dangerous slick that coincided with the annual migration of waterfowl.

State of emergency
Citizens began rescuing and cleaning ducks but were overwhelmed by the number of birds affected. Pine Bend resident George Serbesku brought oil-covered birds to the capitol to ask for assistance. On March 30, 1963, U.S. Fish and Wildlife Management sent officers to rescue waterfowl. On March 31, 172 dead ducks were identified and 300 more were rescued for cleaning. As oil entered nesting areas, Governor Karl Rolvaag declared a state of emergency on April 3. No state organization existed to respond so two units of the Minnesota National Guard were activated.

Public Health Services determined that birds could not see the colorless soybean oil. Exposed birds suffocated or had damaged feathers. This left them unable to move and vulnerable to hypothermia. Birds rescued for cleaning had only a ten percent survival rate. On April 6, the National Guard told Governor Rolvaag that they were struggling to remove oil from the Mississippi. Instead, the rescue effort began diverting oil from the marshes ducks nested in.

On April 8, 1963, the Coast Guard broke the ice on Lake Pepin so oil could disperse safely downriver. The spill caused 3,211 known duck deaths and damaged other bird, mammal, fish, and turtle populations. Water samples taken in June showed little biological activity in areas that had been healthy in April. Long-term damage to life was attributed to oil on the river bottom consuming oxygen as it decayed. Fish and insect eggs in the riverbed suffocated and large fish deaths occurred throughout the year.

Citizens were outraged by the damage done to riverbanks and wildlife. The government received thousands of dollars in donations to rehabilitate ducks, the primary victims of the tragedy. At the time industrial dumping into rivers was common. The only agency regulating water pollution was the Water Pollution Control Commission (WPCC). The WPCC was part of Public Health Services and could only act if a health emergency was created. Therefore, officials had to wait for permission from Honeymead and Richards to inspect their businesses. The sites of the spills could not be seen until April 6.

On January 30, 1963, Senator Gordon Rosenmeier, a conservationist, had introduced a bill giving the WPCC power to enforce rules preventing contamination of groundwater. The Rosenmeier Act was passed on May 22. Public demand resulted in an amendment to prohibit the storage of waste where it could enter state waters. The Rosenmeier Act sparked additional legislation on environmental protection. It also led to the creation of the Minnesota Pollution Control Agency in 1967. The Pollution Control Agency was the first state group to consider pollution an ethical concern.

Notes

References
Robert A. Taft Sanitary Engineering Center, Report on Oil Spills Affecting the Minnesota and Mississippi Rivers, Winter of 1962–1963 Cincinnati: N.p., 1963.
"Blame Oil Slick for Ducks' Deaths," Mankato Free Press, April 1, 1963.
"3 Million Gallons Soybean Oil Spill When Tank Splits," Mankato Free Press, January 23, 1963.
Rigger, Don. "Edible Oils: Are They Really That Different?." 1997 International Oil Spill Conference, U.S. Environmental Protection Agency, 1997.
"A Report on Pollution of the Upper Mississippi River and Major Tributaries." U.S. Department of the Interior, Federal Water Pollution Control Administration Great Lakes Region, Twin Cities- Upper Mississippi River Project, 1966. National Service for Environmental Publication, Washington, D.C.

Further reading
Conference in the Matter of Pollution of the Interstate Waters of the Upper Mississippi River, 1964. Vol. 1, Washington, DC: U.S. Dept. of Health, Education, and Welfare, accessed in U.S. Environmental Protection Agency Region V Library. Chicago, Illinois.
Groenewold, John, Richard Pico, and Kenneth Watson. "Comparison of BOD Relationships for Typical Edible and Petroleum Oils." Journal (Water Pollution Control Federation) 54, no. 4 (1982): 398–405.
Lee, Stephen J. "Operation Save a Duck and the Legacy of the 1962–63 Oil Spills." Minnesota History 58, no. 2 (2002): 105–123.

1962 in the environment
1962 in Minnesota
1963 in the environment
1963 in Minnesota
Environment of Minnesota
Mississippi River
Oil spills in the United States